Somes Bar or Sommes Bar, is an unincorporated community in Siskiyou County, California, United States. Somes Bar has a post office with ZIP code 95568, which opened in 1875. Somes Bar is named after George Somes, who found gold in the area in 1850. It was first located within Klamath County, California until it was absorbed by Siskiyou County when Klamath County was dissolved.

Climate
This region experiences warm (but not hot) and dry summers, with no average monthly temperatures above 71.6 °F.  According to the Köppen Climate Classification system, Somes Bar has a warm-summer Mediterranean climate, abbreviated "Csb" on climate maps.

References

Settlements formerly in Klamath County, California
Unincorporated communities in California
Unincorporated communities in Siskiyou County, California